Iain MacIvor  (6 May 1928 – 17 February 2017) was a British archaeologist and civil servant. He was Chief Inspector of Ancient Monuments for Scotland from 1980 to 1989.

Biography
Born in Carlisle, MacIvor began reading for an English degree at Durham University in 1949, where he fell under the influence of Eric Birley and began participating in archaeological excavations at the Temple of Mithras at Carrawburgh on Hadrian's Wall. After graduation he continued his studies at Oxford under C. E. Stevens.

In 1955 he was appointed as assistant inspector of ancient monuments in the Edinburgh office of what was then the Ministry of Public Building and Works, eventually rising to full inspector, Principal Inspector and finally Chief Inspector before retiring in 1989. He received the Imperial Service Order the same year. David Breeze, another former student of Eric Birley, succeeded to the vacated post. MacIvor's interests gradually progressed from the Roman to the medieval and later periods – his greatest professional interest was said to be military fortifications of the Jacobite era.

MacIvor was elected a Fellow of the Society of Antiquaries of London in 1966, but resigned his fellowship in 2005.

Publications

Books

 MacIvor, Iain. Fort George. HM Stationery Office, 1970 
 MacIvor, Iain. Fortifications of Berwick-upon-Tweed. HM Stationery Office, 1972 
 Fawcett, Richard; MacIvor, Iain; Petersen, Bent; ed. Reynolds, Nicholas. Edinburgh Castle. HM Stationery Office, 1980 
 MacIvor, Iain. A Fortified Frontier: Defences of the Anglo-Scottish Border. Tempus Publishing, 2001

Articles

 Gillam, John P.; Iain MacIvor; Eric Birley. “The Temple of Mithras at Rudchester”. Archaeologia Aeliana. 5th Series, no. 6, 1954, pp. 176–219
 MacIvor, Iain. “The Elizabethan Fortifications of Berwick-upon-Tweed”. The Antiquaries Journal, vol. 45, no. 1, 1965, pp. 64–96
 MacIvor, Iain. “The King’s Chapel at Restalrig and St Triduana’s Aisle: A hexagonal two-storied Chapel of the fifteenth-century”. Proceedings of the Society of Antiquaries of Scotland, vol. 96, 1965, pp. 247–263
 Dunbar, John; MacIvor, Iain. “James's Fort, Stirling”. Proceedings of the Society of Antiquaries of Scotland, vol. 96, 1965, pp. 361–363
 MacIvor, Iain; Thomas, M Clare; Breeze, David. “Excavations on the Antonine Wall fort of Rough Castle, Stirlingshire, 1957-61”. Proceedings of the Society of Antiquaries of Scotland, vol. 110, 1981, pp. 230–285
 MacIvor, Iain; Gallagher, Dennis; Laing, Lloyd et al. "Excavations at Caerlaverock Castle, 1955–66." The Archaeological Journal vol. 156, no. 1, 1999, pp. 143–245

References

1928 births
2017 deaths
Alumni of Hatfield College, Durham
British military historians
English archaeologists
Fellows of the Society of Antiquaries of London